Joel Allwright (born 4 March 1988) is an Australian professional footballer who plays as a full-back for Campbelltown City in the National Premier Leagues.

Allwright was born in Adelaide and played youth football for South Australian and Australian Institutes of Sport as well as Adelaide United. He started his senior career with Para Hills Knights, where he had played junior football, in the South Australian Super League, before moving to Adelaide City in 2012. In 2017, he joined Newcastle Jets.

Allwright appeared for the Australian under-17 side in 2005, including at the 2005 FIFA World Youth Championship.

Playing career

Club
In 2007, Allwright travelled to Scotland for a trial with Dundee United.

Allwright signed with Newcastle Jets from Adelaide City in January 2017 on a mature-aged rookie contract until the end of the 2016–17 season. He made his debut in a draw in an F3 Derby against Central Coast Mariners on 26 February 2017. He returned to Adelaide City at the end of the Jets' season.

Honours

Club
Adelaide City
National Premier Leagues South Australia Premiership: 2017
FFSA Federation Cup: 2013, 2014

Country
Australia
OFC U-17 Championship: 2005

References

External links
 
 

1988 births
Living people
Australia youth international soccer players
Australian soccer players
Association football utility players
Para Hills Knights players
Adelaide United FC players
Adelaide City FC players
Newcastle Jets FC players
A-League Men players
National Premier Leagues players
FFSA Super League players
Australian people of English descent
Soccer players from Adelaide
Association football fullbacks
Association football wingers